Louie Lee Wainwright (September 11, 1923 – December 23, 2021) was an American corrections administrator who served as Secretary of the Florida Division of Corrections from 1962 to 1987. He is known for having been the named respondent in two U.S. Supreme Court cases: Gideon v. Wainwright in which indigents are guaranteed an attorney, and Ford v. Wainwright, in which the Court approved the common law rule prohibiting the execution of the insane. Time Magazine called the Gideon decision one of the ten most important legal events of the 1960s. He also appeared as the respondent in a number of habeas corpus petitions that reached the Supreme Court level during his tenure in office, making "Wainwright" one of the most familiar names to students of habeas corpus law.

Biography
Born in Lawtey, Florida, Wainwright received a master's degree in criminal justice from Nova Southeastern University, later serving as a temporary faculty member there. He was then acknowledged as dean of American Correctional Administrators. Wainwright was appointed secretary of the Florida Division of Corrections by Cecil Farris Bryant (Florida Governor at that time) in 1962, replacing H. G. Cochran and remained in the position until 1987, when Richard L. Dugger assumed the role.

Wainwright served under six governors: Bryant, Haydon Burns, Claude Roy Kirk, Jr., Reubin O'Donovan Askew, Bob Graham, and Wayne Mixson.

He received the American Correctional Association's highest tribute, the E.R. Cass Award, for outstanding service, and his efforts in support of accreditation in Florida and nationwide earned him the 1986 Accreditation Achievement Award from the Commission of Accreditation for Corrections. Wainwright was appointed to the Corrections Foundation Board in 2001 and re-appointed president in 2003 and annually through 2016.

He also served as president of the Florida Peace Officers' Association from 1965 to 1966, where he was still a prominent and respected member. He was once the superintendent of Avon Park Correctional Institution. His post, Secretary of the Florida Division of Corrections, replaced the post of Director of the Division of Corrections.

Wainwright died in Tallahassee, Florida, on December 23, 2021, at the age of 98.

See also
Wainwright v. Greenfield
Ford v. Wainwright
Gideon v. Wainwright

References

External links
Florida Supreme Court Briefs and Opinions

1923 births
2021 deaths
Nova Southeastern University alumni
State cabinet secretaries of Florida
People from Bradford County, Florida